Joe McPhee (born November 3, 1939) is an American jazz multi-instrumentalist born in Miami, Florida, a player of tenor, alto, and soprano saxophone, the trumpet, flugelhorn and valve trombone. McPhee grew up in Poughkeepsie, New York, and is most notable for his free jazz work done from the late 1960s to the present day.

Life and career
McPhee was born in Miami, Florida, on November 3, 1939. He began playing trumpet when he was eight, before learning other instruments. He played in various high school and then military bands before starting his recording career. His first recording came in 1967, when he appeared on the Clifford Thornton album entitled Freedom and Unity. McPhee taught himself saxophone at the age of 32 after experiencing the music of John Coltrane, Albert Ayler, and Ornette Coleman. During the late 1960s and early 1970s, McPhee lectured on jazz music at Vassar College.

In 1975, Werner Uehlinger started the Swiss label Hathut Records with the specific intent of showcasing McPhee's music. In the 1980s, McPhee met Pauline Oliveros, began studying her musical theories, and worked with her Deep Listening Band. He has not yet signed with any major label in his native United States, and was possibly better known throughout Europe than his native country until the 1990s. His 1996 album As Serious As Your Life, which takes its title from the jazz book by Val Wilmer, is "arguably the finest of his solo recordings", according to the AllMusic review.

Jazz musicians with whom McPhee has recorded or performed include Ken Vandermark, Peter Brötzmann, Evan Parker, Mats Gustafsson, Jeb Bishop, The Thing, Clifton Hyde, Jérôme Bourdellon, Raymond Boni, and Joe Giardullo.  Since 1998, McPhee, Dominic Duval, and Jay Rosen have performed and recorded as Trio X. In the 1990s Dominique Eade and McPhee had a jazz ensemble called Naima.

McPhee has written reviews and commentary for Cadence.

In 2005, McPhee was awarded the Resounding Vision Award by Nameless Sound.

Discography
 Underground Railroad (CjR, 1969)
 Nation Time (CjR, 1971)
 Black Magic Man (HatHut, 1971 [1975])
 At WBAI's Free Music Store, 1971 (HatHut, 1971 [1996])
 Trinity (CjR, 1972) with Harold E. Smith and Mike Kull 	
 Pieces of Light (CjR, 1974) with John Snyder
 The Willisau Concert (HatHut, 1976) featuring John Snyder and Makaya Ntshoko
 Tenor (HatHut, 1977) – rereleased as Tenor & Fallen Angels in 2000
 Rotation (HatHut, 1976 [1977])
 Graphics (HatHut, 1977 [1978])	 	
 Variations on a Blue Line (HatHut, 1977 [1979])
 Glasses (HatHut, 1977 [1979])
 MFG in Minnesota (HatHut, 1978) with Milo Fine and Steve Gnitka
 Old Eyes (HatHut, 1980) – rereleased as Old Eyes and Mysteries in 1992 
  Tales and Prophecies  (HatHut, 1981) with André Jaume
 Topology (HatHut, 1981)
 Oleo (Hat Hut, 1982) – rereleased as Oleo & A Future Retrospective in 1993
 Visitation (Sackville, 1985) with the Bill Smith Ensemble
 Songs and Dances (CELP, 1987) with André Jaume and Raymond Boni 	
 Linear B (Hat Hut, 1990)
 Élan • Impulse (In Situ, 1991) with Daunik Lazro	
 Impressions of Jimmy Giuffre (CELP, 1992)
 Sweet Freedom - Now What? (HatArt, 1995) with Lisle Ellis and Paul Plimley 
 McPhee/Parker/Lazro (Vand'Oeuvre, 1995 [1996]) with Evan Parker and Daunik Lazro
 Common Threads (Deep Listening, 1995)	  
 A Meeting in Chicago (Eighth Day Music, 1996 [1997]) with Ken Vandermark and Kent Kessler	
 As Serious As Your Life (Hat Hut, 1996)	
 Legend Street One (CIMP, 1996)	  	
 Legend Street Two (CIMP, 1996)
 Inside Out (CIMP, 1996) with David Prentice	
 Finger Wrigglers (CIMP, 1996) with Michael Bisio
 Specific Gravity  (Boxholder, 1997 [2001]) with Joe Giardullo
 The Brass City (Okka Disk, 1997 [1999]) with Jeb Bishop
 Chicago Tenor Duets (Okka Disk, 1998 [2002]) with Evan Parker
 Zebulon (CIMP, 1998 [1999]) with Michael Bisio
 The Dream Book (Cadence Jazz, 1998 [1999]) with Dominic Duval
  Soprano  (Roaratorio, 1998 [2007)
 In the Spirit (CIMP, 1999)
 No Greater Love (CIMP, 1999 [2000])
 Emancipation Proclamation: A Real Statement of Freedom (Okka Disk, 1999 [2000]) with Hamid Drake 
 Grand Marquis (Boxholder, 1999) with Johnny McLellan
 Manhattan Tango (Label Usine, 2000 [2004]) with Jérôme Bourdellon
 Port of Saints (CjR, 2000 [2005]) with Michael Bisio, Raymond Boni and Dominic Duval
 Voices & Dreams (Emouvance, 2000 [2001]) with Raymond Boni
  Angels, Devils & Haints  (CjR, 2000 [2009]) with  Michael Bisio, Dominic Duval, Claude Tchamitian and Paul Rogers
 Mister Peabody Goes to Baltimore (Recorded, 2000 [2001])
 Remembrance (CjR, 2001 [2005]) with  Michael Bisio, Raymond Boni and Paul Harding
 Tales Out of Time (Hat Hut, 2002 [2004]) with Peter Brötzmann
 A Parallax View (Slam, 2003 [2006]) with Paul Hession
 Between (Ohrai, 2003) with Sato Makoto
 Everything Happens for a Reason (Roaratorio, 2003 [2005]) 
 In Finland (Cadence Jazz, 2004 [2005]) with Matthew Shipp and Dominic Duval
 Next To You (Emouvance, 2004 [2005]) with Raymond Boni, Daunik Lazro and Claude Tchamitchian
 Guts (Okkadisk, 2005) with Peter Brötzmann, Kent Kessler and Michael Zerang
The Open Door (CIMPoL, 2006) with Dominic Duval
Voices: 10 Improvisations (Mode, 2006 [2008]) with  John Heward 
 Red Morocco  (2006)
Tomorrow Came Today (Smalltown Superjazz, 2007) with Paal Nilssen-Love
Alto (Roaratorio, 2009)
Magic (Not Two, 2009) with Mikołaj Trzaska, Dominic Duval and Jay Rosen
The Damage Is Done (Not Two, 2009) with Peter Brötzmann, Kent Kessler and Michael Zerang
Blue Chicago Blues (Not Two, 2010) with Ingebrigt Håker Flaten
Creole Gardens (A New Orleans Suite) (NoBusiness, 2011) with Michael Zerang
Brooklyn DNA (Clean Feed, 2012) with Ingebrigt Håker Flaten
What/If/They Both Could Fly (Rune Grammofon, 2012) with Evan Parker
 Ithaca (8mm Records, 2012) with Eli Keszler
Red Sky (PNL, 2013) with Paal Nilssen-Love
Sonic Elements (Clean Feed, 2013)
Tree Dancing (Otoroku, 2019) with Chris Corsano, Lol Coxhill and Evan Parker

With Trio X
Rapture (Cadence Jazz, 1999)
The Watermelon Suite (CIMP, 1999)
On Tour (Cadence Jazz, 2001)
In Black and White (Cadence Jazz, 2002)
Journey (CIMP, 2003)
The Sugar Hill Suite (CIMP, 2004)
Moods: Playing with the Elements (CIMP, 2005)
Roulette at Location One (Cadence Jazz, 2005)
Air: Above and Beyond (CIMPol, 2006)
2006 U.S. Tour (CIMPol, 2007)
Live in Vilnius (NoBusiness, 2008)
Live On Tour 2008 (CIMPol, 2010)
 Live On Tour 2010 (CIMPol, 2012)

With Survival Unit III 
Don’t Postpone Joy! (Rai Trade, 2006)
Syncronicity]' (Harmonic Convergence, 2011)Game Theory (Not Two Records, 2013)Barrow Street Blues (Holidays Records, 2015)Straylight (Pink Palace, 2015)Straylight (Live at Jazzhouse Copenhagen) (Astral Spirits, Monofonus Records, 2015)

CompilationsA Future Retospective (Hat Hut, 1983) – compiles Old Eyes and OleoNation Time: The Complete Recordings (1969-70) (Corbett vs Dempsy, 2013) – Compiles Nation Times and Black Magic Man with 2 CDs of unreleased live recordingsThe CjR Years (Bo'Weevil, 2014) – 4LP Box Set compiles Underground Railroad, Nation Time, Trinity and  Pieces of LightAs sideman
With Roy Campbell, William Parker & Warren SmithTribute to Albert Ayler Live at the Dynamo (Marge Records, 2009)
With the C. T. String QuartetReqiphoenix Nexus (Cadence Jazz, 1999 [2006])
With Dominic DuvalLive in Concert (Cadence Jazz, 1999)Cries and Whispers (Cadence Jazz, 1999 [2001])Undersound (Leo, 2000)Undersound II (Leo, 2003)
 Rules Of Engagement, Vol. 2 (Drimala, 2004)
With Joe FondaHeat Suite (Konnex, 2003)
With Joe Giardullo
 Shadow & Light (Drimala, 2002)
With Jimmy Giuffre and André Jaume	River Station (CELP, 1993)
With Raphe MalikSympathy (Boxholder, 2002) with Donald Robinson
With Mat ManeriSustain (Thirsty Ear, 2002)
With the Nihilist Spasm BandNo Borders (Non Musica Rex, 2001)
With Evan ParkerThe Redwood Session (CIMP, 1995)
With Jamie SaftTiconderoga (Clean Feed, 2015) 
With Clifford ThorntonFreedom & Unity (Third World Records, 1967)
With The ThingShe Knows...'' (Crazy Wisdom, 2001)

References

External links
 
 Joe McPhee & Clifton Hyde concert video
 MP3 Interview
 Alan McGee on Joe McPhee in The Guardian

Avant-garde jazz musicians
Rune Grammofon artists
1939 births
American jazz saxophonists
American male saxophonists
American jazz trumpeters
American male trumpeters
Living people
21st-century American saxophonists
21st-century trumpeters
21st-century American male musicians
American male jazz musicians
CIMP artists
Cadence Jazz Records artists
Clean Feed Records artists
NoBusiness Records artists
Okka Disk artists